Jo Thönes (born 28 November 1958) is a German percussionist, Jazz drummer and composer.

Life 
Born in Leverkusen, Thönes began playing the drums at the age of thirteen. During his studies, he was a member of Manfred Schoof's band, with whose big band he also performed at the Deutsches Jazzfestival, Prague and the JazzFest Berlin in the 1980s. He also played in s' bands, for example in a trio with Tom van der Geld and was a member of the German-French Jazz Ensemble of Henri Texier and Albert Mangelsdorff, with whom he also performed in a trio. Since 1981, he has been a member of various ensembles of Uli Beckerhoff, in whose recordings of "Private Life" (1992) and "Das Geheimnis" (1994) he was also involved. In 1989, Thönes began his collaboration with Markus and Simon Stockhausen, which also resulted in recordings such as Aparis (1989) and Jubilee (1996).

Thönes increasingly worked as an interpreter of Neue Musik and was involved in performances of works by Charles Ives, Bernd Alois Zimmermann, Mauricio Kagel and Steve Reich. He also composed ballet music for the New York Palindrome Dance Company.

Thönes also worked as a studio musician for film and television productions and as a lecturer at numerous jazz workshops and at the Folkwang University of the Arts before he was appointed professor at the Hochschule für Musik Franz Liszt, Weimar in 1995.

Further reading 
 Martin Kunzler: Jazz-Lexikon. Vol. 2: M–Z (rororo-Sachbuch. 16513). 2nd edition. Rowohlt, Reinbek bei Hamburg 2004, .

References

External links 
 
 

German jazz drummers
German percussionists
Jazz fusion musicians
1958 births
Living people
People from Leverkusen